Michael Mahonen (born 27 April 1964) is a Canadian actor, director and screen writer.

History

Mahonen has Finnish ancestry. After graduating from the Theatre Arts Program at George Brown College in 1989, he auditioned for a young company formed for the Citadel Theatre in Edmonton. His first job as a professional actor involved the role of James Keller in "The Miracle Worker," as well as the roles of Lucius and Popilious Lena in "Julius Caesar."

In 1990, Mahonen was chosen for the role of Gus Pike for the CBC Television program Road to Avonlea. He garnered three Gemini Award nominations in 1993, 1994, and 1995 for his work on the television series. In 1992, he starred as a jazz trumpet player with Billy Dee Williams in the film Giant Steps. He then played Lee Colgan in the CBC miniseries Conspiracy of Silence, directed by Francis Mankiewicz.
  
In 1994, Mahonen co-starred with Michael Riley in the television special "The Facts Behind the Helsinki Roccamatios". He played the character of Paul, a young man dying of the AIDS virus after contracting it from a blood transfusion a few years earlier. In the summer of 1994, he played the role of Jacob Mercer in "Salt Water Moon". This was part of David French's Mercer family saga set in Newfoundland.

Mahonen also guest-starred in numerous American and Canadian television projects, including an episode of Star Trek: Voyager entitled "Nemesis", in which he played a humanoid named "Brone." In 1997, Mahonen starred in Judith Thompson's "Sled" at Toronto's Tarragon Theatre. He then returned to film, co-starring in the 1998 film Captured. He went on to make several more films including Blindness.

In 2003, Mahonen began work on his first feature film Sandstorm. The film involved a fact-based drama about the persecution of Falun Gong practitioners in China. He wrote, directed, and produced the entire film for under $5,000. The cast was made up of volunteers. The film received 29 awards including Best Feature Film, Best Drama, Best Director, and Best Screenplay.

Filmography

References

External links 
 

1964 births
Living people
Film directors from Ontario
Film producers from Ontario
Canadian male screenwriters
Canadian male television actors
People from Kirkland Lake
Canadian people of Finnish descent
Falun Gong practitioners
George Brown College alumni
Male actors from Ontario
20th-century Canadian screenwriters
20th-century Canadian male writers
21st-century Canadian screenwriters
21st-century Canadian male writers